Morgan v Simpson [1975] QB 151 is a UK constitutional law case, concerning the right to vote and the integrity of votes and elections in the United Kingdom.

Facts
Gladys Morgan and four voters in the 1973 election for the Greater London Council petitioned that the election for the seat of Croydon North East was invalid as 44 unstamped ballot papers were not counted. At 18 polling stations, official counters had inadvertently not stamped papers with the official marks. The Labour candidate declared ‘duly elected’, David Simpson, had a majority of only 11, and if the uncounted papers were included, Morgan (the Conservative candidate, and an incumbent) would have won instead by 7 votes. They claimed there was an ‘act or omission’ in breach of an officer’s official duty, and that it affected the result under section 37 of the Representation of the People Act 1949.

The Divisional Court held the election was conducted ‘substantially in accordance with the law as to elections’ and the fact that small errors affected the result was not enough. Morgan appealed. Anthony Scrivener appeared for the Director of Public Prosecutions.

Judgment
The Court of Appeal declared the election invalid, because the result would have been affected. On the proper construction of the Representation of the People Act 1949 section 37(1), any breach of local election rules was enough to compel the court to declare the election void.

Lord Denning MR said the following:

Stephenson LJ concurred and said the following in conclusion:

Lawton LJ gave a concurring opinion, and said the following:

Notes

References
AW Bradley, KD Ewing and CJS Knight, Constitutional and Administrative Law (16th edn 2015) 164

United Kingdom constitutional case law